George Cavendish, 1st Earl of Burlington (31 March 1754 – 9 May 1834), styled Lord George Cavendish before 1831, was a British nobleman and politician. He built Burlington Arcade.

Background
Cavendish was the third son of William Cavendish, 4th Duke of Devonshire and the former Lady Charlotte Boyle, daughter of Richard Boyle, 3rd Earl of Burlington of the first creation, whose title had become extinct upon his death in 1753.

Political career
Cavendish sat as Member of Parliament for Knaresborough from 1775 to 1780, for Derby from 1780 to 1797 and for Derbyshire from 1797 to 1831. On 10 September 1831 he was raised to the peerage as Baron Cavendish of Keighley, in the County of York, and Earl of Burlington, a revival of the title held by his maternal grandfather.

Horseracing
He had horseracing interests. His racing silks were straw colour with a black cap.

Family

In 1815, Lord Burlington bought Burlington House in Piccadilly from his nephew, the 6th Duke of Devonshire. With the architect Samuel Ware, he made a number of significant modifications to the house, including the building of Burlington Arcade along the west side. He died at Burlington House in 1834 and was buried in All Saints' Church, Derby. The property passed to his widow and on her death in 1835 to their son Charles.

He married Lady Elizabeth Compton, only child of Charles Compton, 7th Earl of Northampton, on 27 February 1782 in London.  They had at least 11 children, of whom six children survived to adulthood, although his two eldest sons predeceased him:

 William Cavendish (10 January 1783 – 17 January 1812)
 George Cavendish (14 October 1784 – 22 January 1809)
 Elizabeth Dorothy Cavendish (12 June 1786 – 17 September 1786)
 Lady Anne Cavendish (11 November 1787 – 17 May 1871), married Lord Charles FitzRoy, second son of George FitzRoy, 4th Duke of Grafton
 Gen. The Hon. Henry Cavendish (5 November 1789 – 5 April 1873), married Sarah Fawkener, Frances Susan Lambton and Susanna Emma Byerlie
 Elizabeth Cavendish (13 March 1792 – 26 May 1794)
 Charles Cavendish, 1st Baron Chesham (28 August 1793 – 10 November 1863), married Lady Catherine Gordon, daughter of George Gordon, 9th Marquess of Huntly
 Mary Cavendish (6 March 1795 – 7 June 1795)
 Lady Caroline Cavendish (5 April 1797 – 9 January 1867)
 Frederick Cavendish (28 October 1801 – 27 January 1802)
 Charlotte Cavendish (23 April 1803 – 1 July 1803)

The Earl was succeeded in his earldom by William, the son of his own eldest son William, who had been killed in a carriage accident in 1812.

See also
 Earl of Burlington
 Duke of Devonshire
 Baron Clifford

References

External links
 

1754 births
1834 deaths
01
Children of prime ministers of the United Kingdom
Members of the Parliament of Great Britain for English constituencies
Members of the Parliament of the United Kingdom for English constituencies
Cavendish, George
Younger sons of barons
Cavendish, George
Cavendish, George
Cavendish, George
Cavendish, George
Cavendish, George
Cavendish, George
Cavendish, George
Cavendish, George
Cavendish, George
Cavendish, George
UK MPs who were granted peerages
George Cavendish, 01st Earl of Burlington
19th-century British landowners
Members of the Parliament of Great Britain for constituencies in Derbyshire
Peers of the United Kingdom created by William IV
Non-inheriting heirs presumptive